Bus Éireann ("Irish Bus") is a state-owned bus and coach operator providing services throughout Ireland, with the exception of Dublin and the Greater Dublin Area, where bus services are provided by sister company Dublin Bus. It is a subsidiary of Córas Iompair Éireann (CIÉ). The company's primary hub is Busáras, Central Bus Station, located in Store Street, Central Dublin.

History

Bus Éireann was established in February 1987 when it was split out from Córas Iompair Éireann (CIÉ). The logo of Bus Éireann incorporates a red Irish Setter, a breed of dog that originated in Ireland.

As a result, Shane Ross, TD, Ireland's Minister for Transport, Tourism and Sport, mentioned the company "faces insolvency within 18 months".
Bus Éireann concluded an all out strike on Thursday 13 April that lasted since Friday 24 March 2017.

The company terminated all X1 services to Newry and Belfast due to financial problems.  Expressway no longer serves the six county area (Northern Ireland) however, there is a small service between Newry and Drogheda which is not an expressway service. 
The company does not run any services on Christmas Day.

Services
Bus Éireann's main services in Ireland but they also provide services to Northern Ireland in association with Ulsterbus include: expressway (intercity), commuter, local and school services. Additional services within Ireland include city services in Cork, Galway, Limerick and Waterford and town services in Athlone, Balbriggan, Drogheda, Dundalk, Navan and Sligo.

Bus Éireann operates international services to Great Britain and Europe, that are also provided via the ports at Dublin and Rosslare Europort. Cities served include London, Birmingham, Manchester, Liverpool and Leeds. These are operated under the Eurolines brand.

During the COVID-19 pandemic of 2020-2022 it was noted that Bus Éireann had been the only bus company to continue operating long-distance routes in the country. Speaking to the BBC, the general secretary of the National Bus and Rail Union (NBRU) Dermot O'Leary noted that as the majority of the Irish population stayed at home, the market for commercial companies to make profits on their normal routes ceased overnight, and they subsequently paused operations. As a result, "essential workers [reliant on public transport] could not have gone into hospitals, doctor's surgeries, pharmacies" were it not for Bus Éireann. Bus Éireann also provided the only bus connection between Athlone and the cities of Galway and Dublin for a period in 2020  when private companies such as Citylink temporarily suspended services.

Expressway 
‘Expressway’ is a division of Bus Éireann that provides intercity services throughout the country serving most of the main airports and cities in Ireland.

It is a commercial part of the company, which unlike the local and city services, does not receive government funding to operate.

Service expansion

The National Development Plan included a large expansion in commuter services, especially in the Greater Dublin Area, and so the company greatly increased services on routes such as Dublin/Drogheda/Dundalk, Dublin/Ashbourne, Dublin/Ratoath, Dublin/Dunshaughlin/Navan/Kells/Cavan.

Bus Éireann has also introduced regular clockface schedules on popular Expressway routes, such as hourly services on the routes Dublin/Athlone/Galway, Tralee/Killarney/Cork/Waterford, Cork/Limerick/Shannon Airport/Galway.

At the time of the establishment of the company in February 1987, there were no bus services between Dublin and Belfast. The Dublin/Dublin Airport/Newry/Belfast route was initiated soon after and came to be jointly operated by Bus Éireann and Ulsterbus. Reasons for the routes expansion in the 1990s and 2000s included the economic boom in the Republic, known as the Celtic Tiger; the Northern Ireland peace process which helped boost the economy there, and the rise of the low-cost airline industry, which greatly increased the numbers of people flying in and out of Dublin Airport from both sides of the border. By the 2000s the route operated an hourly service, each way, from 06:00 to 21:00 daily. In October 2006, further services were introduced on the route, departing at 01:00, 03:00, 05:00, and 23:00, thus establishing the route as the first "24-hour inter-city bus service" in the country. In November 2020 the service was suspended indefinitely by Bus Éireann although private companies continue to offer bus services between the two cities. These include Aircoach route 705X (01:30-22:30) and Dublin Coach route 400 (05:30-20:30).

A similar service to the Dublin-Belfast route was implemented on route 2 between Dublin Airport and Wexford, which started on 18 January 2009. Services departed Dublin Airport for Wexford on the hour from 05:00 to 23:00, with services during the night at 01:00 and 03:00. As of May 2022, no services exist on this route now between the hours of 00:00 and 06:00.

As with the Dublin/Belfast route, the Dublin/Derry route is also jointly operated. On 4 September 2006, a new timetable on the Dublin/Derry route was launched, increasing the service level up to nine trips per day, including night-time services.

In 2008 Bus Éireann stated that they also intended to develop similar services to the 24-hour Dublin-Belfast route on the following routes: Donegal-Dublin, Ballina-Dublin, Sligo-Dublin and Drogheda-Balbriggan-Dublin Airport-Dublin. Due to the post-2008 economic downturn in Ireland these plans were never realised. On 20 January 2009, Bus Éireann announced that it was to let 320 staff go and withdraw 150 buses due to the economic crisis. Some services were permanently withdrawn or reduced due to the cutbacks.

In November 2020 Bus Éireann suspended its Dublin to Belfast service, route X1, along with its Expressway services linking Dublin to Cork (route X8), Galway (routes 20 and X20) and Limerick (route X12). The board of the company announced it had taken the decision to end these commercial services, as they were losing money, in order to protect core routes. The financial impact of the COVID-19 pandemic was also cited as a reason for the suspension. Galway-Roscommon TD Claire Kerrane criticised the decision, highlighting the negative impact it would have on passengers who had relied on it in Aughrim, Ballinasloe and Athlone at a time when people were being encouraged to move back to such towns from the cities.

Nightrider
Bus Éireann introduced a number of Dublin 'Nightrider' services in the early 2000s, offering special Friday and Saturday night buses for people departing the city centre to return to locations in the Greater Dublin Area. Over busy periods, the Nightrider could also be extended to operate six days a week, Mon-Sat (observed during the Christmas 2005 period), offering late night transport options to the towns of Newbridge, Drogheda, Navan, Enfield and Wicklow. The route numbers on the Nightrider services were suffixed with an 'N' to denote their night status.

 Route 101N operated from Dublin to Drogheda via Dublin Airport, Swords, Balrothery, Balbriggan, Gormanston Cross and Julianstown. The service left Dublin at 00:30 and 03:30 each Friday and Saturday night. At some point after the year 2013, the route was scrapped as the regular route 101 began to operate on a 24-hours a day basis, with the largest gap between departures being those at 01:30, 03:30 and 05:30.

 Route 109N operated from Dublin to Kells via Dublin Airport, Ashbourne, Ratoath, Dunshaughlin and Navan. On 30 May 2017 Bus Éireann announced it would be discontinuing the route. They did however notify that an alternative service was available on route 109A which operates hourly throughout the night, 7 days per week, 364 days per year. Route 109A operates hourly between 00:30-05:30 whilst the daytime route 109 is inactive.

 Route 126N operated from Dublin to Newbridge via Heuston Station, Inchicore, Newlands Cross, Citywest, Rathcoole Junction, Kill Junction and Naas. The service left Dublin at 00.30 and 03:30 each Friday and Saturday night. On 19 November 2018 Bus Éireann announced the termination of the route noting that costs to run the service were not being covered due to insufficient passenger numbers and it had been loss-making for some time. The operation of the daytime route 126 remained unaffected, but the last departure now left from Dublin at the earlier time of 23.00. In early December 2019 Go-Ahead Ireland took over operation of the route, and reinstated late night departures from the city. As of May 2022, route 126 caters for late night passengers by departing from Connolly station (Mon-Sat) at the times of 00:05, 01:05 and 03:35.

 Route 133N operated from Dublin to Wicklow town, incorporating the towns of Kilmacanogue, Newtownmountkennedy, Newcastle, Ashford and Rathnew. The service left Dublin at 00.30 and 03:00 each Friday and Saturday night. In October 2008 Bus Éireann cancelled the service, mentioning that the route was no longer commercially viable. Others blamed the poor passenger numbers on the lack of adequate promotion or advertisement on the part of Bus Éireann with many people not even knowing the service existed.

The Nightrider service was also extended to Cork city and its environs during Christmas and other high-capacity events such as the Cork Jazz Festival. The service was also extended to Galway city for a time in 2008, departing Eyre Square at 01:30 for Moycullen, 02.30 for Spiddal and 03.30 for the towns of Oranmore and Claregalway. In December 2010 during a period of cold weather, Nightrider services from Dublin to Drogheda, Meath and Kildare were cancelled due to icy conditions.

Tourism services
Bus Éireann operates special one-day sightseeing tours from Dublin to locations such as Glendalough, Newgrange; from Cork, day tours to the Ring of Kerry, County Clare, West Cork, and Cape Clear Island; and from Galway, tours of Connemara and the Burren.

Real Time Passenger Information
RTPI - It is being run by the National Transport Authority under the brand Transport for Ireland, a single portal providing information on public transport in Ireland.

Real Time Information is available across the majority of Bus Éireann's services. The service provides up to the minute information regarding the arrival of a bus at a specific stop. It is calculated using the GPS location of a bus and estimated and changed with current traffic conditions.
Real time information is available to passengers on the Bus Éireann website and also via the Real Time Ireland App.

Many stops across Ireland have real time information available at bus stops that allows the customer to see exactly when the bus will actually arrive.

Stations

Bus Éireann's bus stations have been upgraded in many locations around the country. The prime example is Cork bus station, located at Parnell Place in the city centre, which was remodelled as part of the city's preparation for being European Capital of Culture, 2005.

Other new bus stations include Sligo, Waterford and Letterkenny.

Safety
Bus Éireann has had a few fatal incidents, with those involving school buses being particularly scrutinised. After the death of five schoolgirls in a fatal accident in County Meath in 2005 involving a 1993 DAF MB230/Van Hool (ex front line expressway) school bus. All school buses are fitted with seatbelts from 31 October 2011.

Some non-fatal incidents have also been quite serious, for example, an off-duty bus plunging into the River Liffey in Dublin, after a collision with another vehicle.

The company has also posted notices to encourage orderly queuing at bus stops after a series of incidents where pedestrians on the footpath were struck on the head by the wing mirrors of city buses.

Natural gas buses
Bus Éireann introduced the first NGV on 17 July 2012 in Cork. It operated on the 216 (Cork University Hospital - Cork City Centre - Mount Oval) route until mid-August 2012 on a trial that was undertaken in partnership with Ervia. The Eco-city bus was made by MAN.

Fleet

As of January 2018, the fleet consists of 1,200 buses and coaches.
The company mainly uses buses built by firms such as Scania, VDL Berkhof and Volvo.
Bus Éireann's fleet have been substantially invested in as part of the National Development Plan. The vast majority of the operating fleet for expressway, commuter, and local services are now five years old or less.

Bus Scoile

Bus Éireann operates the School Transport Scheme on behalf of the Department of Education and Science. County Meath VEC assist Bus Éireann in administrating the service in County Meath to all second-level schools. Bus Éireann is responsible for planning routes, employing bus drivers, collecting fares and ensuring compliance with safety regulations and insurance.

The 'Schools' services are mostly operated by cascaded second-hand ex-frontline vehicles. Due to recent regulations regarding seatbelts, all dated and unsuited vehicles were withdrawn replaced with second-hand vehicles (mainly from UK). From 2006 to 2016 Bus Éireann has been purchasing brand new buses from BMC, Euro Coach Builders Donegal, Alexander Dennis and TAM motors Slovenia in 2016.

A number of the routes are outsourced to local bus companies such as Dunshaughlin Coach Hire, Jerry Ryan, O'Rourkes, Bernard Kavanaghs, Bartons, and James Mullally Coach Hire.

Longford bus station has some ex-Dublin Bus school vehicles that are used on Bus Éireann services.

References

External links
 Company website

Bus companies of the Republic of Ireland
Bus transport in the Republic of Ireland
CIÉ